The Faculty of International Relations of the Belarusian State University was founded in 1995. The faculty trains specialists in the following areas: international relations, international law, world economy, management of international tourism, customs, linguistica and area studies, modern foreign languages and cultural studies.

Dean of the Faculty - professor, doctor of historical sciences Shadursky Victor Gennadievich.

History 
October 1, 1995 formed the Faculty of International Relations. In late 2003, at the Department of Oriental Languages Department was opened National Center for Chinese Studies, "Character" (from 2006 Confucius Institute). In 2009, the Center was opened at the Faculty of Korean Studies.

Education building 
Building built center of Minsk, near the railway station and the main building of the Belarusian State University, on the streets of Leningradskaya. 13-storey building was erected ten years. In 2012, it was put into operation. The opening ceremony took place on the housing 1 September 2012 with the participation of President of Belarus Alexander Lukashenko.

References

External links
 Official site of the faculty

Belarusian State University
High-tech architecture